Zinc finger protein 414 is a protein that in humans is encoded by the ZNF414 gene.

References

Further reading